Ural Yekaterinburg is a Russian professional basketball team. The team was formed in 1930 and was restored in 2006, having previously played under the names of Uralmash, SKA-Ural, EvrAz and Ural-UPi. The team won the Russian Basketball Super League titles in 2012, 2013 and in 2022.

History
The team was founded in 1930 as Uralmash Sverdlovsk. In 2001 the club was refunded with the name EvrAz. 

In the 2005–06 season, EvrAz disappeared, but in 2006 the club was refunded once again. Ural became the new main sponsor and the club was renamed Ural-UPi. A year later the name became Ural Yekaterinburg. In 2012 and 2013, Ural won the Super League, the second Russian division but didn't promote. In the 2013–14 season Ural played in a European competition for the first time: in the EuroChallenge it reached the quarterfinals.

Trophies
Russian Basketball Super League (3):
2011–12, 2012–13, 2021-22

Season by season

Players

FIBA Hall of Famers

Notable players

  Stanislav Yeryomin  
  Sergei Belov 
  Ivan Dvorny
  Anatoly Myshkin
  Javonte Douglas

References

External links
Official Website 
Team profile at russiabasket.ru 

Basketball teams in Russia
Basketball teams established in 1930
Sports clubs in Yekaterinburg
Basketball teams in the Soviet Union
1930 establishments in Russia